Kucze Wielkie  (also known as Kucze Duże) is a village in the administrative district of Gmina Jedwabne, within Łomża County, Podlaskie Voivodeship, in north-eastern Poland. Kucze is located some  North-East of Warsaw in the historical region of Mazowsze (Masovia in English), on the outskirts of the Biebrza National Park.

References

Kucze Wielkie